Chung Il-mi, or Il-Mi Chung (Korean: 정일미; born 15 January 1972) is a South Korean professional golfer. She was born in Busan and attended Ewha Womans University. She turned professional in 1995 and joined the LPGA of Korea Tour where she has eight wins. She qualified for the LPGA Tour via the 2003 LPGA Final Qualifying Tournament.

Professional wins

LPGA of Korea Tour wins (9)
1993 (1) Korea Women's Open
1997 (2) Tomboy Women's Open, Daily Women's Open
1999 (1) JP Cup Women's Open
2000 (2) SK EnClean Invitational, SBS Women's Professional Golf Challenge
2002 (2) Korea Women's Open, Hyundai Securities Women's Open
2003 (1) Kim Young Joo Golf Women's Open

Tournaments in bold denotes major tournaments in KLPGA

External links

Profile at the Seoul Sisters site

South Korean female golfers
LPGA of Korea Tour golfers
LPGA Tour golfers
Ewha Womans University alumni
Sportspeople from Busan
1972 births
Living people